Portosins are vinylpyranoanthocyanins, a type of blueish phenolic pigments, found in aged port wine.

See also 
 Wine color

References 

Pyranoanthocyanins